Commercial Bank of Qatar (P.S.Q.C.) (CBQ) commonly known as Commercial Bank, is a private sector bank operating in Qatar since 1975. The bank offers a range of products and services across retail, and corporate banking divisions.

History
Hussain Alfardan established the bank in 1975 as the first private bank in Qatar.

References

Banks of Qatar
Companies based in Doha
Banks established in 1975
Qatari companies established in 1975
Companies listed on the Qatar Stock Exchange